The 1894 North Carolina A&M Aggies football team represented the North Carolina A&M Aggies of North Carolina College of Agriculture and Mechanic Arts during the 1894 college football season.

Schedule

References

North Carolina A&M
NC State Wolfpack football seasons
College football winless seasons
North Carolina A&M Aggies football